The Mob are one of six teams currently competing in SlamBall.

History
The Mob (then Chicago Mob) were one of the first two slamball teams with the then Los Angeles Rumble whom they played a series of exhibition games with, which the Mob ended up winning. They were later joined by the Diablos, Steal, Slashers, and Bouncers for the first ever season of Slamball. The Mob finished with a 4–5 record in the first season, just missing the playoffs. However, the next year, they won their Division and went to the playoffs but lost in the first round to the Riders, who went on to win the championship. Slamball then went on hiatus until 2008, when the Mob returned to the playoffs but again lost in the first round to the Slashers, who later won the championship.

Season-by-season

Personnel

Head coaches

Current roster

References

Slamball
Sports clubs established in 2002